Jean-François Blondel (1683 – 9 October 1756) was an 18th-century French architect.

Biography 
Born in Rouen, Blondel was admitted in the Académie d'architecture in 1728.

He was the master and uncle of Jacques-François. He also had another nephew as a student, Jean-Baptiste Michel Vallin de la Mothe, whom he took in his agency on his return from Rome.

Main realisations 
 Maison Mallet, Geneva, 1724.
 Maison de Saussure, 1724-1730.
 , 1736-1740
 , 1741-1747 (destroyed in 1944)
 Hôtel des gardes du Roi, Versailles, 1750-1754

References

Bibliography

External links 

18th-century French architects
Members of the Académie royale d'architecture
Architects from Rouen
1683 births
1756 deaths